Fort Edwards can refer to:
 A French and Indian War fort near Capon Bridge, West Virginia
 A 19th-century US Army and trading post near Warsaw, Illinois, discussed in Fort Johnson
 A Boer War fort in South Africa, discussed in Breaker Morant

See also
Fort Edward (disambiguation)